The First Live "X-Clan Origins", also known as Monsta X The First Live: X-Clan Origins, is the first Asian concert tour by the South Korean boy group Monsta X. It started on July 16, two months after the release of their third extended play The Clan Pt. 1 Lost, kicking off in Seoul, and then visiting four more Asian countries including Philippines, Indonesia, Taiwan, and Thailand.

Background
In June, Starship Entertainment announced that Monsta X will hold their first solo concert, to be held at the Blue Square Samsung Card Hall in Hannam-dong, Seoul for two days from July 16 to 17.

Monsta X's first stop was in Manila, Philippines on November 27 at the Skydome SM North EDSA.

Monsta X had their second stop in Jakarta, Indonesia at the Indonesia Convention Exhibition on December 10.

Monsta X held their third stop in Taipei, Taiwan at the Taipei International Convention Center on December 18. The group also attended the recording of Taiwan's popular programs such as Hello Hallyu!, 100% Entertainment, Total Entertainment, Idols of Asia, and KKBOX. After that, they confronted a press conference to gain some of the local attention of the press.

Monsta X's Bangkok, Thailand stop was supposed to be on November 12, but postponed on January 7, 2017. The postponement was because of the death of Thailand's King Bhumibol Adulyadej.

Commercial performance
While Monsta X announced their first solo concert, all tickets were sold out within five minutes of opening, wherein all 2,500 tickets were sold out in advance reservations for official fan club members only.

Monsta X's first concert in Taipei, Taiwan also gathered 3,000 audiences.

Setlist

INTRO VCR
 "Trespass"
 "Steal Your Heart"
MENT
 "Broken Heart"
 "Because of U"
MENT
 "Ex Girl"
 "White Sugar"
VCR
 "Yessir" – Jooheon
 "Who Am I" – I.M
 "It's All Yours" – Jooheon and I.M
VCR
 "One in a Million" of Ne-Yo – Shownu
 "Hold On, We're Going Home" of Drake – Hyungwon
 "Anyway" of Chris Brown – Shownu and Hyungwon
 "Runaway Baby" of Bruno Mars – Kihyun
MENT
 "Hieut"
 "Spotlight" 
 "Interstellar"
 

 "Instead of Saying Goodbye" of Rain – Wonho
 "Only Yours" of Lyn and "I Really Like You" of Jewelry – Minhyuk
MENT
 "Cheer Up" of Twice and "Dumb Dumb" of Red Velvet – Shownu, Kihyun, Hyungwon, and I.M
VCR
 "Blue Moon"
 "Perfect Girl"
MENT
 "Honestly"
MENT
 "Focus On Me"
 "Hero"
 "Rush" (Remix)
MENT
 "All In"
 "Gone Bad"
 ENDING MENT
 "Amen"
VCR

ENDING VCR

Tour dates

References

External links
  

Monsta X concert tours
2016 concert tours
K-pop concerts
Concert tours of Asia
Concert tours of Indonesia
Concert tours of South Korea
Concert tours of Thailand
Concert tours of the Philippines